The Reserve Division of Daqing was activated in 1983 in Daqing, Heilongjiang. The division was then composed of:
1st Regiment
2nd Regiment
3rd Regiment
Artillery Regiment

In 1985 it was redesignated as the Reserve Infantry Division of Daqing.

In 1987 the division was converted to an air defense unit as the Reserve Anti-Aircraft Artillery Division of Daqing. The division was then composed of:
1st AAA Regiment - 1st and 4th Drilling Corporation, Daqing Oil Field
2nd AAA Regiment - Daqing Petrochemical Corporation
3rd AAA Regiment
4th AAA Regiment

In January 1999 the division was merged with the Anti-Aircraft Artillery Brigade, 64th Army and redesignated as the Reserve Antiaircraft Artillery Division of Heilongjiang Provincial Military District().

References

Reserve divisions of the People's Liberation Army
Military units and formations established in 1984